Traders Point Eagle Creek Rural Historic District is a national historic district located at Pike Township, Marion County, Indiana, and Eagle Township, Boone County, Indiana.  The district encompasses 109 contributing buildings, 40 contributing sites, and 12 contributing structures in a rural area near Indianapolis.  The district is characterized by the agricultural landscape, farmsteads and estates, recreational landscapes, transportation features including roads and bridges, and historic cemeteries.

It was listed on the National Register of Historic Places in 2009.

References

Historic districts on the National Register of Historic Places in Indiana
Greek Revival architecture in Indiana
Federal architecture in Indiana
Geography of Boone County, Indiana
National Register of Historic Places in Boone County, Indiana
Geography of Marion County, Indiana
Historic districts in Boone County, Indiana
National Register of Historic Places in Marion County, Indiana